The Maisonneuve Monument is a monument by sculptor Louis-Philippe Hébert built in 1895 in Place d'Armes in Montreal.

History 

This monument in memory of Paul Chomedey de Maisonneuve, founder of Montreal, was unveiled on July 1, 1895, as part of the celebrations for the 250th anniversary of the founding of the city in 1892. In 1896, the imposing monument in the centre of Place d'Armes attracted many curious onlookers. 

During the 1890s, a series of commemorative plaques was produced for the first time in Montreal, at the instigation of the Antiquarian and Numismatic Society, which took an active role in the project to build the Maisonneuve Monument. For its part, the Société historique de Montréal in 1892-93 had an obelisk erected in memory of the founders of Montreal. The Francophones and Anglophones of Montreal found common ground in the commemoration of the personalities of New France, with each cultural group highlighting its own heroes.

Statue Base

Bas-reliefs

References

External links

 Fiche: Monument à la mémoire de Paul de Chomedey, sieur de Maisonneuve
 Louis-Philippe Hébert. Monument à Paul de Chomedey, sieur de Maisonneuve (1893) // Art Public Ville de Montréal

1895 in Canada
1895 sculptures
Bronze sculptures in Canada
Buildings and structures completed in 1895
History of Montreal
Monuments and memorials in Montreal
Old Montreal 
Outdoor sculptures in Montreal
Sculptures by Louis-Philippe Hébert
Sculptures of men in Canada
Sculptures of women in Canada
Statues in Canada
Sculptures of dogs in Canada
Sculptures of children in Canada